The 2021 Kids' Choice Awards Mexico took place on September 7, 2021 via Nickelodeon. The awards recognizes the greatest acts of Mexican pop culture, various artists from music, TV and Cinema. As in the previous year the awards were held virtually and were hosted by the internet personalities Bryan SKabeche, Eddy SKabeche and Fede Vigevani. The ceremony, in addition to being broadcast on the channel, was broadcast live on YouTube and Facebook.

Performances
The performers were announced via the official KCA Mexico website.

Winners and nominees
Voting to choose the nominees began on June 28 and ended on July 26. As of the mentioned date, the voting to choose the winners began and ended on August 22.

References

External links
Official website

Nickelodeon Kids' Choice Awards
2021 music awards
2021 in Latin music
Mexican awards